Gérard Gilles Marie Armand Larrousse (born 23 May 1940) is a former sports car racing, rallying and Formula One driver from France. His greatest success as a driver was winning the 24 Hours of Le Mans in 1973 and 1974, driving a Matra-Simca MS670. After the end of his career as racing car driver, he continued to be involved in Formula One as a team manager for Renault. He later founded and ran his own Formula One team, Larrousse, from 1987 to 1994.

Racing career
Born in Lyon, Larousse began his motorsport career in rallying before focusing on circuit racing. He won the French Rally Championship with an Alpine A110. His biggest successes in international rallies came in a Porsche 911. He won the Tour de Corse in 1969, and placed second at the Monte Carlo Rally in 1969, 1970 and 1972. On gravel, he achieved a sixth place at the 1970 RAC Rally.

In a team with Vic Elford in 1971, Larrousse won the 12 Hours of Sebring with a Porsche 917K and the 1000km Nürburgring in a Porsche 908/03.  He would follow this with victory at the 24 Hours of Le Mans in 1973 and 1974 alongside Henri Pescarolo for Matra-Simca. He participated in two Grands Prix, debuting on 12 May 1974, but failed to any score championship points. He drove Brabham BT42s for Scuderia Finotto.

Team management
Following his sports car career, he moved into racing management, running the Elf Switzerland operation in the European Formula Two Championship. From there, Larrousse went on to run the original factory Renault Formula One team during its final days as a full-fledged factory team in 1984 and 1985.

Larrousse also shared ownership of an eponymous Formula One team with various partners, from 1987 to 1994. Although plans were in place to participate in the  season, a lack of funds meant that the team was forced to withdraw from Formula One.

Racing record

Formula One World Championship results
(key)

Complete 24 Hours of Le Mans results

Complete IMC results

External links
 Gerard Larrousse official website (French)

1940 births
Living people
Sportspeople from Lyon
French racing drivers
French Formula One drivers
French rally drivers
Formula One team owners
Formula One team principals
European Formula Two Championship drivers
24 Hours of Le Mans drivers
24 Hours of Le Mans winning drivers
12 Hours of Reims drivers
Silvio Moser Racing Team Formula One drivers
World Sportscar Championship drivers
24 Hours of Spa drivers
Renault people
12 Hours of Sebring drivers

Porsche Motorsports drivers